ABC store may refer to:

 Liquor stores in U.S. states run by an Alcoholic Beverage Control Board
 Alcoholic beverage control states, US states controlling the sale of alcoholic beverages
ABC Commercial, one of a chain of stores operated by the Australian Broadcasting Corporation
ABC Stores (Hawaii), an American convenience-store chain based in Hawaii